Pine Ridge Vineyards is a winery in Napa, California, in the United States.

The winery was started by Gary Andrus and his then wife Nancy, in 1978. They wanted to grow and produce Cabernet Sauvignon and other Bordeaux wines. The tasting room is located in the Stags Leap AVA of Napa Valley. In 2000, the winery was put up for sale and was bought by Crimson Wine Group. The winemaker is Michael Beaulac.

Andrus moved to Oregon in 1993 and died in 2009.

References

1978 establishments in California
Wineries in Napa Valley